Pi Alpha Tau sorority was a national, Jewish women's fraternity operating in the United States between, approximately,  and .

History 
Pi Alpha Tau sorority was established for Jewish women at Hunter College, a unit of the City University of New York. Regardless, Pi Alpha Tau grew slowly and steadily into a national organization.

According to the  Oracle, a group of girls created the new sorority on the Hunter College campus, remarking, "Sorority life was so congenial and agreeable to these modern pioneers that their associates in other college[s] were encouraged to follow the Greek letter path."  established chapters at schools in the New York City metropolitan area, soon in Albany, and by  opened its first chapter outside of the state, in New Jersey.

Further expansion outside of the New York area brought chapters at Cincinnati and Wisconsin, eventually marking a total of 12 chapters, all within the US.

The Great Depression, WWII, and, ironically, gradual Jewish integration into non-Jewish national organizations took its toll: By , Pi Alpha Tau ceased to operate as a national. Circumstances of its dissolution are unknown; three chapters appear to have survived into the s.

Traditions 
According to Harriet Brown, "[The] Sorority conforms with the set rushing rules of the college but deviates in the initiation ceremonies." First, there was an informal pledge ceremony, where the "new girls" attended a party and were "allowed to submit their sorors [~sisters] to all sorts of tests." Then came the formal pledge ceremony, which lasted for six weeks "during which time the new members must submit to the wishes of the older sorors."

Initiation occurred as a "formal installation ceremony, which takes place bi-annually, in December and in May, is presided over by the President of the Grand Council of Pi Alpha Tau".

The convention formal was held annually on Christmas Eve.

The sorority's values, to be inferred from the Oracle article, were "high standards of scholarship and fraternity".

Insignia 
The pledge pin was a diamond divided in half horizontally into two equilateral triangles. The top half being dark colored, the bottom light colored.

The membership badge was a black enamel shield surrounded by jewels. The Greek letters, in gold, were inscribed vertically on the shield. A jewel was between the enamel and the surrounding jewel photo.

Chapter List
Baird's listed most of these chapters in the 12th ed.,, supplemented by information from the Baird's Manual Online Archive. There was no national merger into a successor organization, but some chapters withdrew to local status or joined another national.

See also
 List of Jewish fraternities and sororities
 Sigma Delta Tau
 Alpha Sigma Tau

Notes

References

Further reading 
 Baird's Manual of American College Fraternities, 1940 edition.
 The Oracle of Adelphi College, 1937, p. 89.
 The Album of Washington Square College, 1934, p. 91.
 The Badger, 1931,  University of Wisconsin, p. 385.
 Archival record: "Pi Alpha Tau Sorority Alpha Chapter", housed in Box 19, Folder 4, Sara Delano Roosevelt Memorial House Collection, Archives and Special Collections of the Hunter College, City University of New York. Source for Harriet Brown's historical summary, undated.
 Sanua, Marianne Rachel (2003). Going Greek: Jewish College Fraternities in the United States, 1845 - 1945. Detroit; Wayne State University Press.

Jewish women's organizations
Defunct fraternities and sororities
Student organizations established in the 1910s
Historically Jewish sororities in the United States
1910s establishments in New York City
Jewish organizations established in the 1910s